Karabin is a surname. Notable people with the surname include:

Dan Karabin (born 1955), wrestler who competed for Czechoslovakia
Ladislav Karabin (born 1970), Slovak ice hockey player
Taras Karabin (born 1989), Ukrainian football player
Yaroslav Karabin (born 2002), Ukrainian football player

See also
Karabin, the fourth studio album by Polish singer Maria Peszek, released in 2016
Karabičane
Karambaini
Karrabina